The 709 Crackdown ( or 709案 '709 Case' for short) was a nationwide crackdown on Chinese lawyers and human rights activists instigated during the summer of 2015. It is known as the "709 crackdown" as it started on 9 July 2015.

Yaqiu Wang of Human Rights Watch commented that "the 709 crackdown dealt a terrible blow to China's rights-defense movement, which significantly contracted as rights lawyers were jailed, disbarred or placed under surveillance".

Targets 

More than 300 people were detained as part of the 2015 crackdown. Some of the notable people affected by the crackdown are listed below.
 Li Heping, former human rights lawyer who was abducted in 2015. He was then given a suspended jail term in April 2017, and released in May 2017.
 Wang Quanzhang, arrested in August 2015, stood trial from December 2018 to January 2019, sentenced to 4.5 years imprisonment for subversion of state power, and released from prison on 4 April 2020. Moved by authorities to his former residence in Jinan for two-week COVID-19 isolation period; his wife believes the government used the epidemic as an excuse to keep him under house arrest.
 Wang Yu, lawyer charged with inciting subversion of state power, but released on bail in 2016.
 Wu Gan, human rights activist known as the "Super Vulgar Butcher", who was sentenced to eight years in December 2017.
 Xiang Li, activist forbidden from leaving China during the crackdown, but who was smuggled out of China to Thailand in January 2018.

On 17 June 2020, according to a report from Deutsche Welle, Yu Wensheng, who had defended Wang Quanzhang and publicly called for the removal of Xi as well as for reforms in the legal and political systems, was sentenced to four years in prison and deprived of political rights for three years.

See also
 Human rights in China
 List of Chinese dissidents
 Xu Zhangrun
 810 crackdown
 Strike Hard Campaign Against Violent Terrorism

References 

Chinese dissidents
Chinese human rights activists
Chinese lawyers
Chinese prisoners and detainees
Political controversies in China
Political repression in China
Torture in China